Karmeliukove Podillia is a national park in southwest Ukraine on the forested southern slopes of the Ukrainian Shield.  It is located in the Trostyanets and Chechelnyk districts of Ukraine's Vinnytsia region and the south-eastern portion of historic Podolia. Its area is 16518 hectares, and it was founded on 16 December 2009.

History 
The national nature park was created in accordance with the decree of the President of Ukraine Viktor Yushchenko on December 16, 2009, for the purpose of conservation, restoration and sustainable using of its unique natural and historical-cultural complexes of Southern Podillya that have important environmental, scientific, historical, cultural, aesthetic, recreational and curative value. In the National Nature Park, Karmeliukove Podillia, agreed in due including 20203,4 hectares of state-owned land, including 16,518 hectares of land that are excluded from the state enterprise "Chechelnitsky forestry" and granted National Nature Park in constant use, and 3685, 4 acres of land included in its composition, without exception.

Various associations of plants have been found in the park, among which the hornbeam and beech association stand out, as well as that of Quercetea pubescentis, basically made up of oaks.

Composition
The national nature park also includes several objects of the Ukrainian nature conservation fund.
 Botanic zakaznik "Brytavsky" (national significance)
 Botanic natural monument "Ravine of Tereshchuk" (national significance)
 Botanic natural monument "Romashkovo" (national significance)
 others

Gallery

References

External links

National parks of Ukraine
Protected areas of Ukraine